Amphimallon gianfranceschii is a species of beetle in the Melolonthinae subfamily that is endemic to Italy.

References

Beetles described in 1931
gianfranceschii
Endemic fauna of Italy
Beetles of Europe